A free license or open license is a license which allows others to reuse another creator’s work as they wish. Without a special license, these uses are normally prohibited by copyright, patent or commercial license. Most free licenses are worldwide, royalty-free, non-exclusive, and perpetual (see copyright durations). Free licenses are often the basis of crowdsourcing and crowdfunding projects.

The invention of the term "free license" and the focus on the rights of users were connected to the sharing traditions of the hacker culture of the 1970s public domain software ecosystem, the social and political free software movement (since 1980) and the open source movement (since the 1990s). These rights were codified by different groups and organizations for different domains in Free Software Definition, Open Source Definition, Debian Free Software Guidelines, Definition of Free Cultural Works and The Open Definition. These definitions were then transformed into licenses, using the copyright as legal mechanism. Ideas of free/open licenses have since spread into different spheres of society.

Open source, free culture (unified as free and open-source movement), anticopyright, Wikimedia Foundation projects, public domain advocacy groups and pirate parties are connected with free and open licenses.

Licenses

By type of license 
 Public domain licenses
 Creative Commons CC0
 WTFPL
 Unlicense
 Public Domain Dedication and License (PDDL)
 Permissive licenses
 Apache License
 BSD License
 MIT License
 Mozilla Public License (file-based permissive copyleft)
 Creative Commons Attribution
 Copyleft & patentleft licenses
 GNU GPL, LGPL (weaker copyleft), AGPL (stronger copyleft)
 Creative Commons Attribution Share-Alike
 Mozilla Public License
 Common Development and Distribution License
 GFDL (without invariant sections)
 Free Art License

By type of content 
 Open-source software
 The Open Source Definition
 Open Content
 Open Content License
 Open Publication License
 Open-source hardware
 Open database
 Creative Commons v4
 Open Database Licence

By authors 
 Creative Commons
 Free Software Foundation
 Open Source Initiative
 Microsoft
 Microsoft Public License
 Microsoft Reciprocal License
 Open Content Project
 Open Data Commons from Open Knowledge Foundation
 Public Domain Dedication and License (PDDL)
 Attribution License (ODC-By)
 Open Database License (ODC-ODbL)
European Union
European Union Public Licence

See also 
 License compatibility
 License proliferation

References

External links 
 Open software licenses
 Open licenses
 Various Licenses and Comments about Them - GNU Project - Free Software Foundation
 Licenses - Definition of Free Cultural Works
 proposed Open Source Hardware (OSHW) Statement of Principles and Definition v1.0

Free and open-source software licenses
Contract law
Databases
Computer law
Copyright licenses
Terms of service
Open-source hardware
Patent law